Grace Hickling  (10 August 1908 – 30 December 1986) was a British ornithologist known for studying wildlife on the Farne Islands, in the North Sea off Northumberland.

Early life and education
Hickling was born in 1908, as Grace Watt.  She attended Harrogate Ladies' College and Armstrong College in Newcastle upon Tyne, before attending Newnham College, Cambridge from 1928 to 1931.

Career
Hickling began working as a teacher, but was called for war service during World War II.  She was originally offered the intelligence officer salary of £400 until it was discovered that she was a woman and her pay was cut to £300.  While working as an intelligence officer, Hickling met Russell Goddard, the curator of the Hancock Museum, who first interested her in the Farne Islands.  For the next thirty-eight years she worked as the honorary secretary of the Natural History Society of Northumbria.  When Goddard died in 1948, Hickling began transcribing his notes on Farne Island birds, adding in her own notes.  She produced twenty-two volumes which have been photocopied for future study.  She also spent every spring leading bird tagging in the Farne Islands, where she tagged 187,600 birds.

Achievements and awards
Hickling published two books, The Farne Islands: Their History and Wildlife and Grey Seals and the Farne Islands in 1951 and 1962.  She served as the naturalists' representative for the Lindisfarne National Nature Reserve at its beginning in 1964, and was on the local committee of the National Trust for the Farne Islands from 1949.  In 1974 she was recognized for her work by being made a Member of the Order of the British Empire.  Following her death in 1986, her ashes were scattered in St. Cuthbert's Cove, Inner Farne.

References

1908 births
1986 deaths
British ornithologists
Members of the Order of the British Empire
Women ornithologists
20th-century British zoologists